The Northern Airport Expressway, officially numbered S28, is an 11.29 km toll road extension that runs from G45 Daqing–Guangzhou Expressway (formerly Beijing-Chengde Expressway) to the Beijing Capital International Airport in Beijing, China. It was opened in September 2006. The opening of this road has helped to alleviate traffic on the Airport Expressway, which had been the sole highway link to the airport. The Northern Airport Line allows drivers from Zhongguancun and points north and west of the city to head north first on Jingcheng Expressway before going directly east to the airport, instead of having to go east on the 4th Ring Road to get on the Airport Expressway, where traffic is often clogged near the Siyuan Bridge.

Sources
 Article on beijing.org.cn

References 

Road transport in Beijing
Expressways in China